Gilles Jacob (born 22 June 1930) is a French film critic and essayist, who served as president of the Cannes Film Festival between 2001 and 2014.

Life and career 
Born in Paris, the son of an entrepreneur, Jacob studied at the Lycée Louis-le-Grand, having Claude Chabrol as a schoolmate. At 17 years old he co-founded a short-lived cinema magazine, Raccords. He then collaborated as a film critic and journalist with several publications, including  , Les Nouvelles littéraires and L'Express.

In 1976 he was named deputy delegate general of the Cannes Film Festival, before becoming delegate general in 1978, and finally becoming president of the festival from 2001 to 2014. He stayed in the festival's board of directors until 2018, and since then he served as  member of the General Assembly of  the festival. Among his initiatives, were the foundation of the Un Certain Regard selection, the Caméra d'Or award, and the Cinéfondation.

During his career Jacob received various honours and accolades, notably the Legion of Honour. He served as a juror at the 47th Venice International Film Festival.

References

External links
 

1930 births
Living people
Writers from Paris
French film critics  
French essayists
French film historians
Male essayists
20th-century French writers
20th-century French male writers
20th-century essayists